Petrobrusians were a 12th century sect that rejected infant baptism, Catholic mass, veneration of the cross and prayers for the dead. Petrobrusians are sometimes identified as a precursor to the reformation.

Teachings 
In the system of Peter of Bruys baptism is necessary for salvation, however only a baptism that is done on believers. Petrobrusians saw the cross as a symbol of Christ's suffering, thus they cannot be venerated, and Petrobrusians destroyed crosses into bonfires, in the theology of Peter the gospels were interpreted literally, however the New Testament epistles were subordinate to the gospels. In Petrobrusian theology there was also a low view of the Old Testament, but not a full rejection.  The Petrobrusians were iconoclasts, they rejected transubstantiation and the mass as a sacrifice.

Comparison to Catharism 
Some have attempted to identify Cathar influence in Petrobrusians, but such views have been criticized. The Petrobrusians and Cathars had some similarities, which is why Döllinger identified them as Cathars, the similarities include: rejection of infant baptism, rejection of the veneration of the cross, rejection of transubstantiation, the Petrobrusians also held a low view of the Old Testament, but not a full rejection of the Old Testament. But against the claim that the Petrobrusians were Cathars, there are no existing sources that identify dualism or Manichaeian ascetism in the Petrobrusians, the Petrobrusians also had no hostility to marriage, unlike the Cathars had.

References 

Former Christian denominations
Heresy in Christianity in the Middle Ages